Lee Gi-Young (Korean: 이기영; born 15 November 1965) is a South Korean football referee.

He was a referee at the 2007 AFC Asian Cup. Lee's other events included qualifying matches for the 2010 World Cup.

References

1965 births
South Korean football referees
Living people